St Clair Comets Rugby League Football Club is an Australian rugby league football club based in St Clair, New South Wales formed in 1984. The club now has over 700 registered players and is considered one of the biggest clubs in the Penrith area.

Notable players 
Michael Withers
Ned Catic
Matthew Rieck
Scott McLean
Simon Younes
Wade McKinnon
Steve Turner
Dayne Neirinckx
Frank Pritchard
Ben Rogers
Simon Finnigan
Zeb Taia
Matt Moylan
Junior Paulo
Lancen Joudo
Kurtley Beale
Justin Horo
Joseph Paulo
Blake Austin
Sarafu Fatiaki
Tinirau Arona
Tepai Moeroa
Dallin Watene-Zelezniak
Ryan Walker
Malakai Watene-Zelezniak
Stephen Crichton
Matt Shipley
Jordan Grant
 Joe Chan

See also

List of rugby league clubs in Australia
Rugby league in New South Wales

References

External links
St Clair RLFC website

Rugby league teams in Sydney
Rugby clubs established in 1984
1984 establishments in Australia